Keithville is an unincorporated community in Caddo Parish, Louisiana, United States. It lies to the south of Shreveport along U.S. Route 171. Although unincorporated, it has a post office, with the ZIP code of 71047.

History

Keithville came into existence when two railroads, the Southern Pacific and the Houston-Shreveport, met on properties of the Keith brothers in the early 1880s. One of the Keith brothers was State Representative Perry Polk Keith, who served four terms from 1912 to 1928. A Methodist, Keith donated the land for construction of what is now the Keithville United Methodist in Keithville. Construction was begun in 1904 by Tom Hudnall, and the first service was held on October 4 of that year. The dedication took place in December 1905. The church installed a brass bell in its steeple. Originally used on a locomotive, the bell came from a plantation in Coushatta in Red River Parish.

Economy
Louisiana Department of Public Safety and Corrections operated the Forcht-Wade Correctional Center in Keithville, located in the Eddie D. Jones Nature Park. It closed in July 2012.

Education
The Caddo Parish School Board operates public schools.
 Keithville Elementary/Middle School

Infrastructure

Major highways
 Interstate 49
 U.S. Route 171
 Louisiana Highway 169
 Louisiana Highway 525
 Louisiana Highway 789

Notable people
 Sherri Smith Buffington, former state senator
 Claude King, Country music singer and songwriter known for "Wolverton Mountain" was born in Keithville in 1923; died in Shreveport in 2013
 Keith Nale, Firefighter and former Survivor player, who played in Survivor: San Juan Del Sur, and Survivor: Second Chances.

References

Unincorporated communities in Caddo Parish, Louisiana
Unincorporated communities in Louisiana
Unincorporated communities in Shreveport – Bossier City metropolitan area